Robert Dunne (1830–1917) was an Irish archbishop.

Robert Dunne may also refer to:
 Robert J. Dunne (1899–1980), American football player and coach, and state court judge in Illinois
 Robbie Dunne (born 1979), Irish soccer player
 Steve Dunne (cricket umpire) (born 1943), born Robert Stephen Dunne, New Zealand cricket umpire

See also
 Robert Done, English footballer
 Robert Donne, American musician and composer
 Robert Dunn (disambiguation)